Ellery Sedgwick (February 27, 1872 – April 21, 1960) was an American editor, brother of Henry Dwight Sedgwick.

Early life
He was born in New York City to Henry Dwight Sedgwick II and Henrietta Ellery (Sedgwick), grand daughter of William Ellery. His ancestors, a leading family of Stockbridge, Massachusetts, established a tradition of literary achievement, including authors Catherine Maria Sedgwick and Henry Dwight Sedgwick III.

Career
He graduated from Groton School in 1890 and Harvard University in 1894. He returned to Groton in 1894 and taught Classics there until 1896. Subsequently, he was assistant editor of the Youth's Companion at Boston (1896–1900) and in New York editor of Leslie's Monthly Magazine (1900–05) and the American Magazine (1906–07). He was associated with McClure's Magazine for short periods and with the publishing house of D. Appleton & Co., in 1909 returning to Boston to be editor of the Atlantic Monthly and president of the Atlantic Monthly Company. In 1915 he was elected to the National Institute of Arts and Letters. From his pen came The Life of Thomas Paine (1899).

When Sedgwick purchased the Atlantic Monthly in 1908, the monthly circulation was 15,000 and the magazine ran an annual deficit of $5,000. He worked quickly to reverse the trend and by 1928, he had increased circulation to 137,000. He has been credited with discovering many writers and with having the Atlantic Monthly to be the first national magazine to publish a work of Ernest Hemingway's (the short story Fifty Grand, July 1927). Sedgwick resigned as editor in 1938 and sold the magazine in 1939.

Personal life
Sedgwick married gardener and horticulturist Mabel Cabot in 1904. They had four children: Ellery Jr., Cabot, Theodora, and Henrietta. Mabel Sedgwick designed the gardens at Long Hill, the 114-acre home in Beverly, Massachusetts. She  died in 1937. He remarried in 1939 to an Englishwoman, (Isabel) Marjorie Russell, who became a celebrated horticulturalist. Their summer home in Beverly Massachusetts was renowned for its extensive gardens, and is now the headquarters of the Trustees of Reservations. Sedgwick's son Ellery Jr grew to become a significant player in finance and investments, Cabot was a career diplomat with the US State Department and the father of actress and author Paulita Sedgwick, Theodora worked extensively in South-East Asia and was the wife of Brigadier General William Bond, and Henrietta became a well known horticulturalist in her own right.

Death
Sciatica made Sedgwick bedridden for a few months in 1938–1939, and he was also plagued with arthritis. He died in 1960 in Washington, D.C., and is buried in the Sedgwick family plot in Stockbridge.

References

External links

 
 
 

Groton School alumni
American magazine editors
American biographers
Harvard University alumni
Writers from New York City
American publishers (people)
1872 births
1960 deaths
American people of English descent
Sedgwick family
The Atlantic (magazine) people
Trustees of the Boston Public Library